Knesseth Israel Congregation (KI) is an Orthodox Jewish synagogue in the state of Alabama. The first Orthodox congregation to organize in Birmingham in 1889, the synagogue is currently located at 3100 Overton Road, Mountain Brook, Alabama. Eytan Yammer, a graduate of Yeshivat Chovevei Torah served as rabbi from 2010 through 2016 and was named by The Forward as one of its 33 most inspiring American rabbis in 2015.

History
After incorporating in 1889, the first building for the congregation was constructed in 1903 at cost of $15,000 on the southwest corner of 17th Street North and 7th Avenue North, Birmingham at the heart of what was then a Jewish neighborhood populated by immigrants from Russia and Eastern Europe.

In 1955 the congregation moved to a then-remote site at 3225 Montevallo Road in what is now Mountain Brook. A pillar erected in the yard of the $200,000 synagogue on Montevallo Road (which was considered incomplete, with further plans for a 1200-1500 seat sanctuary) was intended to serve as the cornerstone of a more permanent building. A second phase, adding a social and recreational wing, was undertaken in 1969.

In May, 1984, then Rabbi Harry (Tzvi) Rosen (who went on to edit Kashrus Kurrents for the Star-K) discovered that one of the torahs had been stolen from the synagogue. While talking with local police about the theft, he received a phone call asking for ransom money to return the torah scroll, at which point the police called in the FBI. While the investigation was ongoing, early the following month the Rabbi received another phone call indicating that the missing torah had been found in a Salvation Army donation bin.

Knesseth Israel, facing deteriorating conditions in their synagogue, began moving forward with plans for a new building in 2003, taking up the suggestion of relocating to the site of the former Our Savior Evangelical Lutheran Church on Overton Road. The congregation hoped to take advantage of the high value of the Montevallo Road property, which faces the Birmingham Country Club golf course, to help finance the move, which brought them within a few blocks of the Bais Ariel Chabad Center and strengthening ties within Birmingham's Orthodox Jewish community. The congregation voted in December 2005 to make the move and raised $5.4 million in donations. Of the nearly 100 families in Knesseth Israel at the time, many walked to Sabbath services so the decision required them to find new homes in the Overton neighborhood straddling Mountain Brook and Cahaba Heights.

The new 18,000 square-foot brick building was completed in Fall 2007. On November 11, 2007 the congregation held a celebratory procession to the new building, carrying the congregation's six Torah scrolls. The new facility includes a sanctuary, a smaller chapel, a mikvah for ritual immersion, an outdoor permanent Sukkah structure, offices, classrooms, library, social hall, playground, and two separate kitchens for the preparation of kosher meals. It also features a 50 square foot rose style stained glass window designed and fabricated by local artist Andrea Lucas. Across the street a new house was also built for the KI rabbi. However, in July 2012 the congregation, faced with debts arising from a disappointing return on their former property (which was only sold after the nationwide collapse of the real estate market during the Financial crisis of 2007–08), put the new Overton Road building up for sale. Birmingham Jewish Federation president Jimmy Filler contacted prominent community members Fred and Brenda Friedman about the possibility of helping the congregation remain in place by purchasing the building. The result was the establishment of the Fred and Brenda Friedman Center for Jewish Life which hosts events and programs for several Jewish organizations while also providing a permanent home for Knesseth Israel.

Services and programs
In February 2012, an eruv covering two square miles of Mountain Brook and Cahaba Heights was erected by Rabbi Yammer (with the Halachic guidance of Rabbi Yaakov Love).
As of January 2015, the congregation has a daily morning Shacharit service in combination with the Chabad Center (Sundays, Mondays, and Thursdays at Chabad; Tuesdays, Wednesdays, and Fridays at KI), regular Shabbat and Holiday services followed by a full kiddush lunch, and Friday night Kabbalat Shabbat services weekly. There is also an education program for young children held on Sunday mornings and multiple weekly adult learning programs.

In popular culture
Elderly members of the Knesseth Israel Congregation appeared in the 1990 music video for "Minyan Man", recorded by Lenny Solomon and Shlock Rock.

Rabbinical leadership
 Rev. M. Herman (1891)
 M. Grosberg (1897–1899)
 Rev. Rabbi Yasgour (1904)
 J. T. Loeb (1909–1913)
 Rev. A. Feinsilver (1913–1918)
 Rev. Jacob Mendelsohn (1918–1920)
 Solomon Katz (1921-1922)
 Rev. David Stein (1923–1924)
 Abraham Chaimovitz (1925–1926)
 H. A. Laibovitz (1926–1930)
 Abraham Bengis (1930–1933)
 Isadore Sperling (lay leader, 1933–1934)
 Alex Klein (1937–1941)
 Louis Werfel (1942–1943)
 Joseph Goldberg (1943–1946)
 Jonathan Silberberg (1949–1955)
 David Tamarkin (1955–1957)
 Seymour Atlas (1959–1962)
 Nahum Ben Nathan (1963–1967)
 Moshe Stern (1968-1980)
 Harry (Tzvi) Rosen (1980-1987)
 Reuven Tradburks (1987–1994)
 Meir Rosenberg (1995–1997)
 Avraham Shmidman (1998–2007)
 Karmi Ingber (2007–2009)
 Eldad Zamir  (2009) (visiting Rabbi for High Holidays)
 Eytan Yammer (2010–2016)
Moshe Rube (2017 - Present)

Notable members
 Philip Birnbaum

See also

List of synagogues in the United States
List of places with eruvin

Sources
 Garrison, Greg (November 24, 2007) "New Knesseth Israel Orthodox synagogue opens in Birmingham." Birmingham News
 Wolfson, Hannah (October 1, 2006) "Knesseth Israel moving to Overton Road." Birmingham News
 Garrison, Greg (September 17, 2004) "Knesseth Israel plans to rebuild." Birmingham News
 Garrison, Greg (July 9, 2012) "Orthodox synagogue for sale: Knesseth Israel in Birmingham puts campus on the market for $5.5 million". Birmingham News
 "Staying alive: Birmingham's Knesseth Israel won't have to leave its new building" (June 6, 2013) Southern Jewish Life
 Bonfield, Barbara, Knesseth Israel: Over 123 Years of Orthodoxy, Birmingham, AL. Seacoast Publishing, 2012.
 "Knesseth Israel Congregation" (January 3, 2015)

References

External links
 Knesseth Israel Congregation website

Jews and Judaism in Appalachia
Orthodox synagogues in Alabama
Orthodox synagogues in the United States
Religious organizations established in 1889
Synagogues completed in 2007